Edward John O'Dea (November 23, 1856 – December 25, 1932) was an American prelate of the Catholic Church. He served as bishop of the Diocese of Nesqually in Washington State from 1896 until 1907.  When the Vatican renamed the diocese as the Diocese of Seattle in 1907, O'Dea served as its bishop until his death in 1932.

O'Dea was responsible for the construction of St. James Cathedral in Seattle, Washington.

Biography

Early life 

Edward O'Dea was born in the Dorchester neighborhood of Boston, Massachusetts, to Edward and Ellen (née Kelly) O'Dea, both Irish immigrants. Edward O'Dea elder traveled west during the California Gold Rush in 1849. The family settled in Portland, Oregon, in 1866.

Edward O'Dea younger attended St. Ignatius College in San Francisco, California and graduated from St. Michael's College in Portland in 1876. He continued his studies at the Grand Seminary of Montréal in Montreal, Quebec.

Priesthood 
O'Dea was ordained to the priesthood by Archbishop Édouard-Charles Fabre on December 23, 1882. Following his return to Portland, he served as a curate at the Cathedral of the Immaculate Conception Parish. He served as private secretary to Archbishop William Gross until 1892, when he became pastor of St. Patrick's Church in Portland.

Bishop of Nesqually 
On June 13, 1896, O'Dea was appointed the third Bishop of Nesqually by Pope Leo XIII. 

He received his episcopal consecration on September 8, 1896, from Archbishop Gross, with Bishops Jean-Nicolas Lemmens and Alphonse Glorieux serving as co-consecrators, at St. James Cathedral (now a proto-cathedral) in Vancouver. 

When he took office, O'Dea was confronted with financial difficulties, including a $25,000 debt for the construction of the cathedral in Vancouver.

Bishop of Seattle 
The Vatican renamed the diocese as the Diocese of Seattle on September 11, 1907, and moved the seat of the diocese from Vancouver to Seattle's Capitol Hill. O'Dea dedicated St. James Cathedral later that year. He guided the diocese through World War I and the anti-Catholic sentiment engendered by Initiative 49, a Ku Klux Klan-sponsored initiative to make parochial schools illegal. His final accomplishment was the establishment of St. Edward Seminary in Kenmore, Washington, in 1930.

Death and legacy 
O'Dea died on December 25, 1932, at age 76, two days after celebrating the 50th anniversary of his ordination. His final words were "God bless you all."

O'Dea High School in Seattle was named after O'Dea.

References

External links

1856 births
1932 deaths
Clergy from Boston
American Roman Catholic clergy of Irish descent
Roman Catholic Archdiocese of Portland in Oregon
19th-century Roman Catholic bishops in the United States
20th-century Roman Catholic bishops in the United States
History of Seattle
Roman Catholic bishops of Nesqually
Roman Catholic bishops of Seattle